There are a number of national symbols of Moldova, representing Moldova or its people in either official or unofficial capacities.

List of national symbols

Official symbols

Unofficial symbols

 <small>Source: Akademos

References